Wori is a district in North Minahasa Regency, North Sulawesi, Indonesia. As of 2010, the estimated population of Wori is 17,980 people. The district contains the following villages:

 Budo
 Bulo
 Darunu
 Kima Bajo
 Kulu
 Lansa
 Lantung
 Mantehage Bango
 Mantehage Buhias
 Mantehage Tangkas
 Mantehage Tinongko
 Minaesa
 Nain
 Ponto
 Talawaan Atas
 Talawaan Bantik
 Tiwoho
 Wori

References 

Populated places in North Sulawesi